Hygrophila is a taxonomic superorder of air-breathing freshwater snails, aquatic pulmonate gastropod mollusks within the clade Panpulmonata. 

The families in this clade are basically air-breathing freshwater snails including freshwater limpets.  The three families with the greatest number of species are the Lymnaeidae (pond snails), the Planorbidae (ramshorn snails) and the Physidae (pouch or bubble snails). These are found in ponds, creeks, ditches, and shallow lakes nearly worldwide.

The snails in this clade have their eyes located at the base of their tentacles, rather than at the tips, as in the true land snails Stylommatophora.  They have shells that are thin, translucent, and relatively colorless, and they lack an operculum.

Taxonomy

1997 taxonomy 
In the older taxonomy of the Gastropoda (Ponder & Lindberg, 1997) these families were placed in the suborder Basommatophora.

2005 taxonomy 
Hygrophila has been a clade in the informal group Basommatophora within the Pulmonata.

Clade Hygrophila:
Superfamily Chilinoidea Dall, 1870
Family Chilinidae Dall, 1870
Family Latiidae Hutton, 1882
Superfamily Acroloxoidea Thiele, 1931
Family Acroloxidae Thiele, 1931
Superfamily Lymnaeoidea Rafinesque, 1815
Family Lymnaeidae Rafinesque, 1815
Superfamily Planorboidea Rafinesque, 1815
Family Planorbidae Rafinesque, 1815
Family Physidae Fitzinger, 1833

Note: what was previously the family Ancylidae has been demoted in the new taxonomy to the status of tribe Ancylini Rafinesque, 1815 within the subfamily Planorbinae Rafinesque, 1815 of the family Planorbidae Rafinesque, 1815.

2010 taxonomy 
Basommatophora (Siphonarioidea and Amphiboloidea and Hygrophila) have been found polyphyletic and so Jörger et al. (2010) have moved Hygrophila to Panpulmonata.

2020 taxonomy 
A comprehensive molecular phylogenetic analysis of Hygrophila based on 3112 sites of the large subunit and 5.8S ribosomal RNA genes resulted in a proposal of a new taxonomic revision of the group.
 Chilinoidea Dall, 1870
 Lymnaeoidea Rafinesque, 1815
Synonyms
 Acroloxoidea Thiele, 1931: synonym of Lymnaeoidea Rafinesque, 1815
 Planorboidea Rafinesque, 1815: synonym of Lymnaeoidea Rafinesque, 1815

References 

Panpulmonata